Eunjoon Kim is a professor of KAIST and director of Center for Synaptic Brain Dysfunctions within the Institute for Basic Science (IBS). With over 150 publications to his name, his research has been cited over 16,000 times giving him an h-index of 61 and i10-index of 121. He graduated from Busan National University in 1986, received master's degree at KAIST in 1988, received PhD degree at Michigan State University in 1994, and worked at Harvard Medical School as a postdoctoral fellow during 1995-1996. His current research focuses on molecular organization of neuronal synapses and synapse dysfunction-related psychiatric disorders.

Education
1982. 3 – 1986. 2  	B.S., Dept of Pharmacology, Busan National University, Korea
1986. 3 – 1988. 2      M.S., Dept of Biological Engineering, Korea Advanced Institute of Science and Technology (KAIST), Korea
1991. 9 – 1994. 12	Ph.D., Dept of Pharmacology and Toxicology, Michigan State University

Work
1988. 3 – 1991. 8	Research Associate, Korea Research Institute of Bioscience and Biotechnology, Daejeon, Korea
1995. 1 – 1997. 2	Postdoc, Dept of Neurobiology and Howard Hughes Medical Institute, Harvard Medical School.P.I.: Morgan Sheng
1997. 3 – 2000. 2	Assistant Professor, Dept of Pharmacology, Busan National University, Korea
2000. 3 – 2014  	Assistant, Associate, & Full Professor, Dept of Biol. Sci., KAIST, Korea
2003. 7 – 2012.5       Director, National Creative Research Initiative Center for Synaptogenesis, Korea
2012. 6 – present 	Director, Center for Synaptic Brain Dysfunctions, Institute for Basic Science, KAIST, Korea

Awards
2018: Asan Award in Medicine, ASAN Foundation
2014: KAISTian of the Year, KAIST
2013: POSCO Chungam Award, POSCO
2012: Life Science Award, Korean Society for Molecular Cell Biology
2012: Inchon Award, Dong-A Ilbo
2012: Life Science Award, Korean Society for Molecular and Cell Biology
2011: Best Research Award, KAIST
2005: BPS Award, Korean BioPharmacal Society
2004: Young Scientist Award, Korean Academy of Science and Technology
2003: Academic Award, KAIST
1991: Korean Government Overseas Scholarship, Ministry of Education

References

1964 births
Living people
Academic staff of KAIST
South Korean neuroscientists
Michigan State University alumni
KAIST alumni
Institute for Basic Science